Yumi Tasma Stynes (born 2 June 1975) is a feminist television and radio presenter, podcaster and author. She is the co-host of KIIS FM's 3PM Pick-Up radio show and presenter of the ABC Radio podcast Ladies, We Need to Talk about female health and sexuality. She presented the morning television show The Circle and was also a television presenter on Channel V Australia and Max. During 2013 she was a presenter on Sydney's Mix 106.5 FM radio breakfast program. A portrait of Stynes by Yoshio Honjo was a finalist for the 2022 Archibald Prize.

Early life
Stynes was born and grew up in Swan Hill, Victoria, Australia. Her mother is Japanese and her father was fifth generation Australian. She spent her teenage years in Melbourne attending Methodist Ladies College Kew before moving to Sydney to work for Channel V Australia.

Career

Radio
In August 2011, Stynes hosted 3PM Pick-Up with Chrissie Swan, broadcast nationally on Mix 101.1, Mix 106.5, Mix 102.3, Mix 106.3 & 97.3 FM. She remained co-host until August 2012 and was replaced by Jane Hall.
 
In January 2013, Stynes hosted Mix 106.5's breakfast program with Sami Lukis the first all-female team on FM commercial radio in Sydney.

In January 2017, Stynes joined the KIIS Network to host 3PM Pick-Up with Katie 'Monty' Dimond and Rebecca Judd.

Television
Stynes' television career began in 2000 as a presenter for Channel V Australia.

In 2007, she moved across to MAX where she presented The Know .

From 2010 until 2012, Stynes hosted Network Ten's morning show, The Circle.

In 2018 Stynes hosted a documentary on SBS called "Is Australia Sexist?"

Ben Roberts-Smith incident

On the 28 February 2012 episode of The Circle, along with George Negus, Stynes made comments about a photo of Corporal Ben Roberts-Smith, a Victoria Cross and Medal for Gallantry recipient, coming out of a swimming pool. After tabloid criticism, they personally contacted Roberts-Smith who accepted their apology and agreed there was no malicious intent. Negus said his comments were taken out of context and he was not referring personally to Roberts-Smith.

On 13 September 2014, Fairfax newspapers issued an apology to Stynes and Negus, stating "Our interpretation was wrong and we accept that both Mr Negus and Ms Stynes were not referring to Cpl Roberts-Smith personally."
News Limited publications, The Daily Telegraph, Herald Sun and news.com.au also retracted the incorrect allegations.

Kerri-Anne Kennerley incident

On 28 January 2019, Yumi Stynes appeared as a guest panelist on Studio 10. When host Kerri-Anne Kennerley, a member of the Logie Hall of Fame, raised the plight of at-risk Indigenous women and children, Stynes repeatedly suggested Kennerley was "racist". Kennerley was left "seriously offended" following the "attack" and later, while speaking on-air with 2GB's Ben Fordham, expressed concern about possible damage it may cause to her reputation. The following day Stynes called in "sick" for a booked appearance on Studio 10, stating on Instagram that it was not related to what happened the day before although she later clarified that "the reason I didn't go on the show is because it's not for me to argue Indigenous rights." She also claimed that she "would have been walking into a trap" if she appeared again on Studio 10 the next day. Stynes instead participated in a radio interview on The Kyle and Jackie O Show, saying “Kennerley has been around forever, she’s like a cockroach, she can’t be extinguished”. During that radio interview, the hosts conducted a phone interview with Kennerley to discuss the previous day's argument, before which Stynes described her as "lecturing me about racism". Stynes' "attack" on Kennerley was condemned in the press and online, with one outlet labelling it "lazy" and "predictable".

Publications 
The Zero Fucks Cookbook- Best Food Least Effort, 
Zero Fucks Cooking- Endless Summer, 
Welcome to Your Period (co-authored with Melissa Kang aka "Dolly Doctor"), 
Welcome to Consent (co-authored with Melissa Kang aka "Dolly Doctor"), ISBN 
Ladies, We Need to Talk (co-authored with Claudine Ryan), ISBN 9781743797518

Podcast
Stynes is a writer and host of ABC Radio podcast on female health and sexuality, "Ladies, We Need to Talk".

References

External links
The Circle

1975 births
People from Swan Hill
Living people
Australian television presenters
Australian people of Japanese descent
Australian VJs (media personalities)
Australian music critics
Australian women music critics
Australian music journalists
Australian radio presenters
Australian women radio presenters
Australian women television presenters
Australian women podcasters
Australian podcasters